Incheon Korean Air Jumbos is a South Korean professional volleyball team. The team was founded in 1969 and became fully professional in 2005. They are based in Incheon and are members of the Korea Volleyball Federation (KOVO). Their home arena is Gyeyang Gymnasium in Incheon.

Honours 
 Korea Volleyball Super League
Runners-up: 1999

V-League
Champions (3): 2017–18, 2020–21, 2021–22
Runners-up (5): 2010–11, 2011–12, 2012–13, 2016–17, 2018–19

KOVO Cup
Winners (5): 2007, 2011, 2014, 2019, 2022
Runners-up (2): 2010, 2020

Season-by-season records

Players

2022−23 team

See also 
 Korean Air

References

External links 
 Official website 

Volleyball clubs established in 1969
Sport in Incheon
South Korean volleyball clubs
Korean Air
1969 establishments in South Korea